Divvy is the bicycle sharing system in the Chicago metropolitan area, currently serving the cities of Chicago and Evanston. The system is owned by the Chicago Department of Transportation and has been operated by Lyft since 2019. As of Sept 2021, Divvy operated 16,500 bicycles and over 800 stations, covering 190 square miles.

History
In 2007, Chicago Mayor Richard M. Daley visited Paris, France, where he tested their Vélib' bicycle sharing system and was "greatly impressed". He determined that a similar system would work well in Chicago. After returning from his European trip, Mayor Daley requested proposals from private partners to create a bike share system for Chicago. Two potential operators came forward but submitted plans that would have been too expensive for the city to fund.

In May 2012, the City of Chicago awarded Alta Bicycle Share (acquired by Bikeshare Holdings LLC in 2014 and renamed to Motivate) a contract for "the purchase, installation, and operation of a bicycle sharing system".

On June 28, 2013, Divvy launched with 750 bikes at 75 stations in an area from the Loop north to Berwyn Ave, west to Kedzie Ave, and south to 59th St. A planned expansion of the number of stations in spring 2014 was delayed to 2015 due to supply shortages.

Unionization 
In October 2014, TWU (Transport Workers' Union) Local 100 of New York City filed an election petition with the NLRB seeking to represent "almost 70 full-time and part-time workers, including mechanics and truck drivers, who are paid $12 to $16 an hour."

The unionization effort came after employees of Citi Bike in NYC, owned by the same parent company Motivate (formerly Alta Bicycle Share), joined TWU Local 100 in September 2014 and alongside similar efforts by employees of Motivate in Boston (Hubway) and Washington, D.C. (Capital Bikeshare).

2019 expansion
In March 2019, Mayor Rahm Emanuel proposed a 9-year contract to grant Lyft (owner of Motivate) exclusive rights to operate the city-owned system and receive a portion of the subsequent advertisement revenue. The deal required Lyft to invest  to add 175 stations and 10,500 bikes to the system, expand to all 50 city wards by 2021, and add electric pedal bikes which could lock to both Divvy stations and conventional bike racks.

The proposal passed a Pedestrian and Traffic Safety Committee vote in the City Council on April 8 and was approved by the full City Council on April 10.

As of September 2019, Divvy had 608 stations (594 stations in Chicago and 14 in Evanston).

Branding
The name Divvy is a playful reference to sharing ("divvy it up"). Divvy’s light-blue color palette and four stars evoke the Chicago flag. The double Vs in the Divvy logo refer to the shared-lane markers painted on bike lanes throughout the city, and are a nod to how the city prioritizes bike safety, paving the way for new riders.

The naming, logo, and brand strategy for the system was developed through a partnership between the global design firm IDEO and the Chicago brand strategy studio Firebelly Design. IDEO led the project's research, conceptual brand development, and naming phases; Firebelly team led the identity design, communication system and brand guideline phases.

The first 4,000 Founding Members received limited edition black keys; regular members received blue keys.

Equipment

Divvy bicycles are utility bicycles with a unisex step-through frame that provides a lower center of gravity and ease of access to a wide range of heights. All bikes are painted "Chicago blue", with the exception of one "unicorn bike": a bright red bike, dubbed #Divvyred.

The one-piece aluminum frame and handlebars conceal cables to protect them from vandalism and inclement weather. The heavy-duty tires are designed to be puncture-resistant and filled with nitrogen to maintain proper inflation pressure longer. Divvy bikes have three speeds, a bell, and a front rack.

The bikes are manufactured in the Saguenay, Quebec region by Cycles Devinci. PBSC Urban Solutions supplies bicycles, docking stations, and payment kiosks for the system.

Through the end of October 2014, the Chicago Blackhawks partnered with Divvy to release five black and red Blackhawks-branded bikes.

See also
Cycling in Chicago
List of bicycle sharing systems

References

External links
Divvy | Your bike sharing system in Chicago
Firebelly Design Case Study
IDEO Case Study

Community bicycle programs
Cycling in Chicago
2013 introductions
Articles containing video clips
2013 establishments in Illinois
Bicycle sharing in the United States